Karcze may refer to the following places:
Karcze, Greater Poland Voivodeship (west-central Poland)
Karcze, Masovian Voivodeship (east-central Poland)
Karcze, Podlaskie Voivodeship (north-east Poland)